Balaraj is an Indian actor in the Kannada film industry. He has appeared in Anand (1986), Ratha Sapthami (1986), Shiva Mecchida Kannappa (1988) and Samyuktha (1988).

Television

 Mane Aliya
 Parvathi
 Preethi Madu Thamashe Nodu
 Durga
 Kanyadana
 Suryavamsha
 Silli Lalli
 Kalyani Rama
 Kalyani
 Gokula
 Kalyanirama
 Ramachaari (TV series)

Selected filmography
Balaraj has appeared in the following Kannada films.

 Chiranjeevi Sudhakar (1988)
 Mana Mecchida Hudugi (1987)
 Sharavegada Saradara (1989)
 Nanjundi Kalyana (1989)
 Nambidre Nambi Bitre Bidi (1990)
 Rudra Thandava (1990)
 Neene Nanna Jeeva (1990)
 Thavarumane Udugore (1991)
 Police Matthu Dada (1991)
 Hrudaya Haadithu (1991)
 Bangaradantha Maga (1991)
 Nagaradalli Nayakaru (1992)
 Mavanige Thakka Aliya (1992)
 Malashree Mamashree (1992)
 Jeevana Chaitra (1992)
 Sidukabeda Singari (1993)
 Poorna Sangrama (1993)
 Vasantha Poornima (1993)
 Mouna Sangrama (1993)
 Kumkuma Bhagya (1993)
 Hendthi Helidare Kelabeku (1993)
 Dharma Peeta (1993)
 Anuragada Alegalu (1993)
 Sammilana (1994)
 Sagara Deepa (1994)
 Mana Midiyithu (1995)
 Sipayi (1996)
 Mouna Raga (1996)
 Ammavra Ganda (1997)
 Chora Chittha Chora (1999)
 Bannada Hejje (2000)
 Yuvaraja (2001)
 Aunty Preethse (2001)
 Olu Saar Baree Olu (2002)
 Kogile O Kogile (2002)
 Kambalahalli (2002)
 Sye (2005)
 Rakshaka (2007)
 Aliya Geleya (2009)
 Panchavati (2011)
 Krishnan Marriage Story (2011)
 Katari Veera Surasundarangi (2012)

See also

List of people from Karnataka
Cinema of Karnataka
List of Indian film actors
Cinema of India

References

External links

 Biography of Balaraj on chiloka.com
 Biography of Balaraj on Indiaglitz.com

Male actors in Kannada cinema
Indian male film actors
Male actors from Karnataka
20th-century Indian male actors
21st-century Indian male actors